The Simon Mayo Breakfast Show  was the weekday breakfast show on BBC Radio 1 between May 1988 and September 1993. The programme was broadcast on weekdays, apart from on bank holidays, and had three broadcast slots. Firstly, the show aired between 7am and 9.30am, gaining an extra 30 minutes on 3 April 1989 to co-inside with an earlier start to Radio 1’s day. Finally, when Radio 1 began 24-hour transmissions on 1 May 1991, the programme was broadcast between 6am and 9am. The programme ended as part of the major shake-up of BBC Radio 1 schedule by Matthew Bannister, which saw Mayo move to the station’s mid-morning slot.

Format

The programme, which was based on a "zoo" format, saw Mayo being joined by The Breakfast Crew consisting of news anchor Rod McKenzie and the weather/travel presenter girls. Rod McKenzie was the newscaster throughout the programme's run but there were four regular presenters during the show’s 5 and a bit years on air. They were Carol Dooley (1988), Sybil Ruscoe (1988–89), Jackie Brambles (8 Jan - 14 Sep 1990) and Dianne Oxberry (October 1990 
until the programme ended three years later). Weather and travel news reader stand-ins included Lynn Parsons, Caron Keating and Philippa Forrester and newsreader stand-in included Peter Bowes. The show's producer was Ric Blaxill who also made regular speaking contributions.

News headlines were broadcast every 20 minutes. 30-second headline bulletins aired at 10 to and 10 past, alongside the full bulletin at half past the hour. The weather forecast was broadcast at 5 and 35 past, travel news at 25 and 55 past and a brief sports update was broadcast at around 20 past.

Monday's programme featured a rundown of the new UK Top 40 singles chart which was followed by a playing of that week's number one.

Features

The programme became known for various features, including On This Day In History, the cryptic game The Identik-Hit Quiz, where Mayo and his co hosts would 'act' a short scene which cryptically led listeners to the title of a hit song and in August 1990 he launched his Confessions feature where members of the public sought absolution for their (often frivolous or humorous) "sins", and it moved to a television series in later years.

Break-out Hits
Due to frequent plays from Mayo, several unlikely hit singles reached the UK charts, including "Kinky Boots" by Patrick Macnee and Honor Blackman; "Donald Where's Yer Troosers?" by Andy Stewart; and "Always Look on the Bright Side of Life", sung and written by Eric Idle. For helping Monty Python have a hit with the latter 13 years after it first appeared on the soundtrack to The Life of Brian, Idle presented Mayo with a model bare foot, in the style of the animated version which used to end the opening titles to the TV show.

References

BBC Radio 1 programmes
British radio breakfast shows
1988 radio programme debuts
1993 radio programme endings